The Heriberto Gil Martínez Airport  is an airport serving the municipality of Tulua in the Valle del Cauca Department of Colombia.

The airport was formerly Farfan Airport, named after an unverified pre-Hispanic tribe. On 20 August 2004, it was renamed after Heriberto Gil Martínez, one of the first aviators in Colombia, who along with Camilo Daza founded the FAC.

It has no commercial air services. Currently the airstrip is used by the Marco Fidel Suárez Military Aviation School (EMAVI) de Santiago de Cali. Although the airport is central in one of the great intermountain valleys of Colombia, its short runway has hindered interest in establishing scheduled air service.

The Tulua VOR-DME (Ident: ULQ) is located on the field.

See also 

Transport in Colombia
List of airports in Colombia

References

External links 
OpenStreetMap - Tulua
OurAirports - Tulua
SkyVector - Tulua
FallingRain - Tulua Airport

Farfan Heriberto
Buildings and structures in Valle del Cauca Department